The soprano saxophone is a higher-register variety of the saxophone, a woodwind instrument invented in the 1840s. The soprano is the third-smallest member of the saxophone family, which consists (from smallest to largest) of the sopranissimo, sopranino, soprano, alto, tenor, baritone, bass, contrabass saxophone and tubax. Soprano saxophones are the smallest and thus highest-pitched saxophone in common use.

The instrument
A transposing instrument pitched in the key of B, modern soprano saxophones with a high F key have a range from concert A3 to E6 (written low B to high F) and are therefore pitched one octave above the tenor saxophone. There is also a soprano saxophone pitched in C, which is uncommon; most examples were produced in America in the 1920s.

The soprano has all the keys of other saxophone models (with the exception of the low A on some baritones and altos). Soprano saxophones were originally keyed from low B to high E, but a low B mechanism was patented in 1887 and by 1910 nearly all saxophones were keyed to low B including sopranos. During the 1920s it became standard for sopranos to be keyed to high F. Starting in the 1950s, high F was offered as an option on some sopranos, and by the 1970s most professional-level instruments had a high F key. Nearly all sopranos made today are keyed to high F as standard, and some recent professional sopranos (e.g. those made by Yanagisawa, Selmer, and Yamaha) may have a high G key next to the F key. Additionally, skilled players can make use of the altissimo register, which allows them to cover these notes and play even higher, usually regardless of their instrument's keyed range.

Many sopranos made since the 1990s feature detachable necks and will include one straight and one downward-curved neck. A fully straight soprano must be held upward and outward while playing, which allows it to project well and can allow for a more energetic appearance in performance. A curved neck allows the instrument to be held somewhat downward and still maintain a proper mouthpiece angle, which makes for easier use of a music stand and can reduce fatigue in the right arm for some players. Some also believe that a curved neck gives the soprano a warmer, less nasal tone, although this is the subject of debate among players. However, some players, technicians, and engineers prefer one-piece sopranos over a detachable neck because the neck receiver/tenon system is prone to excessive wear and can develop leaks over time which hinder the instrument's playability if not corrected, so due to some players' preference for curved necks, occasionally one-piece instruments are bent during manufacturing above the octave key (e.g. the Yamaha YSS-62R and YSS-82ZR). Some manufacturers also produce fully curved sopranos which look much like a small alto saxophone with a straighter neck/crook, as well as 'tipped-bell' sopranos which are straight but have the bell angled upward somewhat and are typically used with a curved neck (these are often called 'saxellos' for their resemblance to the somewhat rare Saxello model produced by King in the 1920s, though an actual Saxello's bell is angled more and its bore is different). All variants have the same keys and range as the traditional straight soprano, but as with the necks, some players believe curved and tipped-bell sopranos sound warmer and less nasal.

Due to the higher pitch of the soprano, it is more sensitive with respect to intonation than the lower saxophones, so a player must have more skill with breath support, tongue and soft palate position, and embouchure (collectively known as voicing). It is also less forgiving of poor maintenance than lower saxophones. This has led to the common belief that soprano is either inherently out of tune, or far more difficult to play than lower saxophones, but many experienced players and teachers disagree with these sentiments.

Soprano saxophone mouthpieces are available in various designs, allowing players to tailor their tone as desired.

In classical music
The soprano saxophone is mainly used as a solo and chamber instrument in classical music, though it is occasionally used in a concert band or orchestra. It is included in the saxophone quartet and plays a lead role. Many solo pieces have been written for it by composers such as Heitor Villa-Lobos, Alan Hovhaness, Jennifer Higdon, Takashi Yoshimatsu, Charles Koechlin, John Mackey, Miklos Maros, Marc Mellits, and Belinda Reynolds.

As an orchestral instrument, it has been used in several compositions. It was used by Richard Strauss in his Sinfonia Domestica, where included in the music are parts for four saxophones, including a soprano saxophone in C. It is also used in Maurice Ravel's "Boléro" and has a featured solo directly following the tenor saxophone's solo. Vincent d'Indy includes a soprano in his opera Fervaal.

Notable classical soprano saxophonists include Carina Rascher, Christine Rall, Michael Hernandez, Eugene Rousseau, Kenneth Tse,  Jean-Yves Fourmeau, Jean-Denis Michat, Vincent David, Rob Buckland, John Harle, Mariano Garcia, Claude Delangle, Arno Bornkamp, Timothy McAllister, and Christopher Creviston.

In jazz
While not as popular as the alto and tenor saxes in jazz, the soprano saxophone has played a role in its evolution. Greats of the jazz soprano sax include 1930s virtuoso Sidney Bechet, 1950s innovator Steve Lacy, and, beginning with his landmark 1961 album My Favorite Things, John Coltrane.

Other well-known jazz players include:  Wayne Shorter, Mack Goldsbury, Paul McCandless, Johnny Hodges, Walter Parazaider, Oliver Nelson, Bob Berg, Joe Farrell, Lucky Thompson, Sonny Fortune, Anthony Braxton, Sam Rivers, Gary Bartz, Bennie Maupin, Branford Marsalis, Kirk Whalum, Jan Garbarek, Danny Markovitch of Marbin, Paul Winter, Dave Liebman, Evan Parker, Hanah Jon Taylor, Sam Newsome, Kenny G, Jane Ira Bloom and Charlie Mariano (including in his work with bassist Eberhard Weber).

Other notable soprano saxophonists include Julian Smith, Joshua Redman, Jay Beckenstein, Dave Koz, Grover Washington Jr., Ronnie Laws, LeRoi Moore, Sarah Skinner of Red Dirt Skinners, and Nigerian Afrobeat multi-instrumentalist Fela Kuti.

Big band music sometimes calls for an alto or tenor saxophone player to double on soprano saxophone, particularly the lead alto.

In popular culture
Similar to the flute, the soprano saxophone is culturally associated with smooth jazz and easy listening. Thus, it is often the subject of various instrumental "background music" played in elevators, hotels, supermarkets, shopping malls and other indoor facilities.

Kenny G has become a colloquial icon of the instrument, featuring in occasional commercials and internet memes. Julian Smith inspired by the work of Kenny G, placed third on Britain's Got Talent in 2009, doing a solo performance in each of three appearances with a soprano saxophone.

In some popular music interpretations, the soprano saxophone is commonly paired with FM-type electric piano and electronic drum sounds to create a smooth, R&B-like arrangement. It is also popular in Japanese music, most commonly within the AOR and city pop genre.

Similar instruments 
Because of its sometimes similar sound to the oboe, the soprano saxophone can be confused with it by listeners. The soprano saxophone may also be used as a substitute when an oboe is not available.

The soprano saxophone is also sometimes confused with the Bclarinet. The clarinet has a distinctly different timbre, is usually much quieter, can play an augmented fourth lower and is commonly played as much as a fifth higher (though the soprano saxophone can also be played this high with altissimo, it is uncommon for a player to do so). The saxophone is made of brass and is either lacquered or plated with silver, gold, or occasionally black nickel, while the clarinet is either black or distinctly wood-grained, with silver or gold keys.

In 2001, François Louis created the aulochrome, a woodwind instrument made of two joined soprano saxophones, which can be played either in unison or in harmony.

Gallery

See also
List of saxophonists

References

Concert band instruments
Saxophones
B-flat instruments